The Dollarton area is a beach, slope and suburb in the District of North Vancouver, British Columbia, Canada.

Notable residents
Author Malcolm Lowry and his wife Margerie lived in a series of shacks in the Cates Park area in the 1940s, where they finished the third and fourth drafts of Under the Volcano. His presence in the Dollarton area's history is celebrated in the annual "Under the Volcano" music and poetry festival, named after his most famous novel. It is held in Cates Park, on the shores of Burrard Inlet, where there is also a monument in his memory.

References

North Vancouver (district municipality)
Populated places in Greater Vancouver